Doman is a surname. It is of English Origin and means "doom-man" or judge.

Notable people with the surname include:

Amanda Doman (born 1977), Australian softball player
Brandon Doman (born 1976), American college football quarterback, coach and offensive coordinator
David Doman, American engineer
Cătălin Doman (born 1988), Romanian footballer
Jim Doman (1949–1992), American poker player
John Doman (born 1945), American actor
Willem Doman (born 1950), South African politician